Wuming District is one of 7 districts of the prefecture-level city of Nanning, the capital of Guangxi Zhuang Autonomous Region, South China. The district was approved to build from the dissolution of the former Wuming County by the Chinese State Council  on February 16, 2015. Located north of the city proper, it borders the prefecture-level city of Baise to the west.

Language
Zhuang is the most widely spoken language of the district. The Zhuang dialect spoken in Shuangqiao (双桥镇) in Wuming District is used as the basis for the pronunciation of Standard Zhuang.

Several varieties of Chinese are spoken in Wuming, including Wuming Mandarin, Putonghua, Hengtang dialect (a dialect of Pinghua), Xinmin dialect (a dialect of Hakka) and Cantonese.

Climate

References

External links 

County-level divisions of Guangxi
Nanning